Provan Hall (also known over time as Provanhall, Hall of Provan and 'Hall Mailings) is a historic place composed of two buildings built about the 15th century and situated in Auchinlea Park, Easterhouse, Glasgow. It is owned by the National Trust for Scotland and managed by Glasgow City Council. The two parallel buildings, enclosing a courtyard, are protected as a category A listed building.

Location
Provan Hall is located in the  Auchinlea Park adjacent to the Glasgow Fort retail centre.

Naming
The name "Hall of Provan" was used in early records. Today, the use of the name "Provan Hall" is used to refer to the buildings collectively.

Residents

After the Scottish Reformation, Provan Hall became a residence of the lawyer and President of Session, William Baillie (died 1593) and his wife Elizabeth Durham. In 1566 he was collector of the teinds or tithes known as the "Thirds of Benefices" for the parsonage of Glasgow. As a judge, he was known as Lord Provand. He was called the "Prebend of Barlanerk alias Provan", and in November 1592 James VI of Scotland confirmed his ownership of the mill and meadow of Provan.

His daughter the heiress of Provan, Elizabeth Baillie (died 1609), married Robert Hamilton (died 1642), a son of Andrew Hamilton of Goslington and Silvertonhill. They gave the house and lands to their eldest son, Francis Hamilton, on 31 October 1599. James VI confirmed Elizabeth Baillie's gift of Provan to her son on 15 November 1600.

Francis Hamilton of Silvertonhill (died 1645) married Agnes Hamilton, a daughter of the Laird of Innerwick and a niece of the lawyer Thomas Hamilton. He was known as poet and published verses in praise of the late James VI and I in 1626, dedicated to the Marquess of Hamilton and the Chancellor of Scotland, George Hay of Kinnoull. In later life, Francis Hamilton claimed he had been the victim of witchcraft practiced against him before his marriage by Isabel Boyd, Lady Blair, a daughter of Thomas Boyd, 6th Lord Boyd. She had been contracted to marry him in 1607, and Francis Hamilton may have come to blame his misfortunes in life on her. He sold the lands to his brother Edward Hamilton and ownership of Provan descended in the Hamilton of Silvertonhill family. Above the arched entrance to the courtyard, a carved stone includes the initials "R.H" for Robert Hamilton, and the date 1647.

In 1667, Robert Hamilton sold the property to Glasgow City Council. The council created the office of "Bailie of Provan" to manage the estate. In 1729 the burgh council sold the house and remaining lands to Robert Lang. Although all the lands were sold by 1767, the council appointment of a Bailie of Provan continued.

Gallery

See also
Provand's Lordship, built in 1471, also in Glasgow.
Provanhall, a small nearby residential district of East Glasgow that takes its name from Provan Hall.

References

External links
Provanhall House

Houses completed in the 15th century
Category A listed buildings in Glasgow
Country houses in Glasgow
National Trust for Scotland properties
15th-century establishments in Scotland